Paul Hermann Bildt (19 May 1885 – 13 March 1957) was a German film actor. He appeared in more than 180 films between 1910 and 1956. He was born in Berlin and died in Zehlendorf, West Berlin.

Selected filmography

 Devil in Silk (1956)
 Ich suche Dich (1956)
 The Plot to Assassinate Hitler (1955)
 A Heart Full of Music (1955)
 The Dark Star (1955)
 Reaching for the Stars (1955)
 Ludwig II (1955)
 Sky Without Stars (1955)
 Son Without a Home (1955)
 Sauerbruch – Das war mein Leben (1954)
 The Missing Miniature (1954)
 The Angel with the Flaming Sword (1954)
 As Long as You're Near Me (1953)
 The Stronger Woman (1953)
 Must We Get Divorced? (1953)
 Toxi (1952)
 No Greater Love (1952)
 All Clues Lead to Berlin (1952)
 The Great Temptation (1952)
 Father Needs a Wife (1952)
 Heart of Stone (1950)
 The Council of the Gods (1950)
 Don't Dream, Annette (1949)
 The Beaver Coat (1949)
 Blum Affair (1948)
 Raid (1947)
 Tell the Truth (1946)
 Kolberg (1945)
 Opfergang (1944)
 The Great Love (1942)
 With the Eyes of a Woman (1942)
 Attack on Baku (1942)
 Friedemann Bach (1941)
 The Girl from Fano (1941)
 The Gasman (1941)
 The Girl at the Reception (1940)
 Our Miss Doctor (1940)
 Bachelor's Paradise (1939)
 The Leghorn Hat (1939)
 Woman Without a Past (1939)
 Who's Kissing Madeleine? (1939)
 D III 88 (1939)
 Robert Koch (1939)
 The False Step (1939)
 Twelve Minutes After Midnight (1939)
 Alarm at Station III (1939)
 The Governor (1939)
 Yvette (1938)
 Anna Favetti (1938)
 All Lies (1938)
 The Roundabouts of Handsome Karl (1938)
 You and I (1938)
 By a Silken Thread (1938)
 Dance on the Volcano (1938)
 The Deruga Case (1938)
 Madame Bovary (1937)
 The Man Who Was Sherlock Holmes (1937)
 The Ruler (1937)
 To New Shores (1937)
 Signal in the Night (1937)
 Donogoo Tonka (1936)
 Moscow-Shanghai (1936)
 Savoy Hotel 217 (1936)
 City of Anatol (1936)
 Victoria (1935)
 William Tell (1934)
 Thea Roland (1932)
 The Invisible Front (1932)
 1914 (1931)
 Dreyfus (1930)
 The Other (1930)
 Prinz Louis Ferdinand (1927)
 Potsdam (1927)
 Sister Veronika (1927)
 Lützow's Wild Hunt (1927)
 The Girl with the Five Zeros (1927)
 The Flames Lie (1926)
 Children of No Importance (1926)
 People to Each Other (1926)
 Slums of Berlin (1925)
 The Hanseatics (1925)
 Destiny (1925)
 The Humble Man and the Chanteuse (1925)
 Our Heavenly Bodies (1925)
 An Artist of Life (1925)
 Doctor Wislizenus (1924)
 The Pilgrimage of Love (1923)
 A Woman, an Animal, a Diamond (1923)
 Friedrich Schiller (1923)
 The Pagoda (1923)
 The Lady and Her Hairdresser (1922)
 The Haunted Castle (1921)
 Lady Hamilton (1921)
 The House in Dragon Street (1921)
 Parisian Women (1921)
 The Woman in the Trunk (1921)
 The Golden Plague (1921)
 Figures of the Night (1920)
 The Prisoner (1920)
 The Guilt of Lavinia Morland (1920)
 The Living Dead (1919)
 Rose Bernd (1919)
 The Adventure of a Ball Night (1918)
 Precious Stones (1918)
 The Nun and the Harlequin (1918)
 Imprisoned Soul (1917)
 The Princess of Neutralia (1917)

References

External links 

1885 births
1957 deaths
German male film actors
German male silent film actors
20th-century German male actors